Fokker D.X (or D.10) was a Dutch fighter aircraft designed after World War I.

The chief designer at Fokker, Reinhold Platz, designed the Fokker D.VIII fighter in 1918. It was a parasol monoplane with cantilever wings, which was an uncommon feature of the time. Its rotary engine could only develop 82 kW (110 hp), but it had good flying qualities. 60 aircraft were manufactured in Germany.

After the war, Anthony Fokker moved his factory to the Netherlands, where production continued. The D.X was an enlarged development of the D.VIII, which saw limited success. Ten aircraft were sold to Spain and one to Finland, where it was in use 1923-24.

Operators
 Spanish Air Force (10)
 Finnish Air Force (1)

Specifications (D.X)

See also

References

1920s Dutch fighter aircraft
D 10
Aircraft first flown in 1921
High-wing aircraft